WOW Hits 2010 is a two-disc compilation album composed of some of the biggest hits on Christian radio in 2009. Disc one features more adult contemporary hits, while disc two features the CHR–pop and rock hits. The album charted at number one on the Hot Christian Albums chart and number 33 on the Billboard 200.

The album was certified Gold by the RIAA on February 17, 2010, and Platinum on April 9, 2014.  It has sold 338,000 copies in the US as of April 2010.

Track listing

Sales figures 
The album has sold 338,000 copies as of April 2010.

Charts

See also
 WOW Series

References

External links
 WOW Hits official website

WOW series albums
2009 compilation albums
2010